In enzymology, a phosphoglucokinase is an enzyme that catalyzes the chemical reaction

ATP + alpha-D-glucose 1-phosphate  ADP + alpha-D-glucose 1,6-bisphosphate

Thus, the two substrates of this enzyme are ATP and alpha-D-glucose 1-phosphate, whereas its two products are ADP and alpha-D-glucose 1,6-bisphosphate.

This enzyme belongs to the family of transferases, specifically those transferring phosphorus-containing groups (phosphotransferases) with an alcohol group as acceptor.  The systematic name of this enzyme class is ATP:alpha-D-glucose-1-phosphate 6-phosphotransferase. Other names in common use include glucose-phosphate kinase, phosphoglucokinase (phosphorylating), and ATP:D-glucose-1-phosphate 6-phosphotransferase.  This enzyme participates in starch and sucrose metabolism.

References

 

EC 2.7.1
Enzymes of unknown structure